The 1942 Second Air Force Bombers football team represented the Second Air Force during the 1942 college football season. The team, based at Fort George Wright in Spokane, Washington, compiled an 11–0–1 record and defeated the Hardin–Simmons Cowboys in the 1943 Sun Bowl.

Despite its undefeated record, the Second Air Force team and all other service teams were omitted from the football rankings. Washington State, ranked No. 16 in the final AP Poll, played the Second Air Force team to a 6–6 tie.

Red Reese, who coached football and basketball at Eastern Washington College before the war, was the team's head coach. The team was led by a backfield that included former Washington State quarterback Bill Sewell, fullback Vic Spadaccini from Minnesota, Hal Van Every, a triple-threat halfback who played for the Green Bay Packers before the war, and Johnny Holmes from Washington State.
The linemen included ends Al Bodney and Bill Hornick, former Stanford center Tony Cavelli, Glen Conley of Washington and Don Williams of Texas at tackle, Tony Rosselli of Youngstown and Bill Holmes of Washington at guard.

Schedule

References

Second Air Force
Second Air Force Superbombers football seasons
Sun Bowl champion seasons
College football undefeated seasons
Second Air Force Superbombers football